Douglas "Doug" John Herland (August 19, 1951 – March 26, 1991) was a 1984 Summer Olympics bronze medal Winner, coxing the Men's Pair with coxswain (2+) event.  Following his successes at the Olympics, Herland began the "Freedom on the River" campaign, obtaining government funding for materials and equipment necessary for disabled people to row.

Throughout the rest of his life, Herland would continue to champion and promote adaptive rowing.  Born with brittle bone disease (Osteogenesis Imperfecta), Herland stood a mere 4'8" (142 cm) and weighed 107 pounds (48.5 kg).

Coaching positions
Ewauna Rowing Club, Klamath Falls (1975–1978)
University of Michigan (1980-198?)
Pacific Lutheran University (1985–1988) --Took over the rowing program after the "retirement of Dave "Smed" Peterson (1974–1984).

External links
Ewauna Rowing Club
PLU Experience
Mention of him in a speech
Pacific Lutheran University Rowing
"Unbreakable": First hand account of Herland's Life as told by friend Trudy Williams

1951 births
1991 deaths
Olympic bronze medalists for the United States in rowing
Rowers at the 1984 Summer Olympics
Coxswains (rowing)
People with osteogenesis imperfecta
Pacific Lutheran University people
American male rowers
Medalists at the 1984 Summer Olympics